Erik Flynn Stocklin (born September 24, 1982) is an American actor. He is known for his recurring roles on television series such as Mistresses, Stalker and Good Trouble, and for his leading role in the Netflix original series Haters Back Off.

Early life and career 
Stocklin was born in Freehold, New Jersey. He attended Southern Connecticut State University and earned a bachelor's degree in theatre in 2007. While in college, he played for four summers with the Elm Shakespeare Company in New Haven, Connecticut. He also trained at the Circle in the Square Theatre School in New York City. In 2008, he moved to California.

Stocklin has played leading roles in feature films including Donner Pass (2011) and The Bad Guys (2015). He also appeared on television in recurring roles on Mistresses (2013) and Stalker (2014–2015), and he guest-starred on The Vampire Diaries (2011), Bones (2014) and Timeless (2018), among others. He has also appeared in national commercials for Marmot, Apple, Hyundai, Mazda and McDonald's. 

In 2016 and 2017, he co-starred in the Netflix series Haters Back Off, opposite series creator Colleen Ballinger, whom he married in 2018. Stocklin appeared in two 2019 episodes of the Netflix series Lucifer. In 2021, Stocklin and Ballinger, began a weekly podcast titled Relax! with Colleen and Erik. In 2021 and 2022, he played Matt in the television series Good Trouble.

Personal life
Stocklin began dating Colleen Ballinger, his co-star from Haters Back Off, by early 2018. The couple wed later the same year. They have three children: a son, Flynn Timothy Stocklin, born on December 10, 2018, and twins, Wesley Koy and Maisy Joanne Stocklin, born on November 6, 2021.

Filmography

References

External links
 
 Stocklin's acting reel (2014)

1982 births
21st-century American composers
American male television actors
American male film actors
Circle in the Square Theatre School alumni
Living people
People from Freehold Borough, New Jersey
Southern Connecticut State University alumni